Marion Purcell is a Welsh international lawn and indoor bowler.

Bowls career
In 2015, she won the mixed pairs title at the 2015 World Indoor Bowls Championship with Robert Paxton. She won a second title partnering Nick Brett in the mixed pairs at the 2020 World Indoor Bowls Championship.

References

1960 births
Welsh female bowls players
Living people
Indoor Bowls World Champions